Glenn Kershaw is an American television writer, director, and producer known for his directorial works on American Television series, including Third Watch, Criminal Minds, and Army Wives.

Filmography

As producer 
 Somewhere, Tomorrow (1983)
 Twisted (1986)
 The Night Train to Kathmandu (1988)
 Third Watch (2001-2005)
 Criminal Minds (2006 - 2020)
 Home Burial (2013)
 98% Human (2017)

As director

Army Wives 
 Rules of Engagement (2007)
 First Response (2009)
 Hearts & Minds (2010)
 Handicap (2012)

Criminal Minds 
 2.12 Profiler, Profiled - December 13, 2006
 2.22 Legacy - May 9, 2007
 3.13 Limelight - January 23, 2008
 3.20 Lo-Fi - May 21, 2008
 4.02 The Angel Maker - October 1, 2008
 4.10 Brothers in Arms - December 10, 2008
 5.06 The Eyes Have It - November 4, 2009
 5.22 The Internet Is Forever - May 19, 2010
 6.03 Remembrance of Things Past - October 6, 2010
 6.09 Into the Woods - November 17, 2010
 6.23 Big Sea - May 11, 2011
 7.01 It Takes a Village - September 21, 2011
 7.11 True Genius - January 18, 2012
 7.24 Run - May 16, 2012
 8.01 The Silencer - September 26, 2012
 8.13 Magnum Opus - January 23, 2013
 8.24 The Replicator - May 22, 2013
 9.01 The Inspiration - September 25, 2013
 9.11 Bully - December 11, 2013
 9.24 Demons - May 14, 2014
 10.01 X - October 1, 2014
 10.13 Nelson's Sparrow - January 28, 2015
 10.19 Beyond Borders - April 8, 2015
 10.23 The Hunt - May 6, 2015
 11.01 The Job - September 30, 2015
 11.07 Target Rich - November 11, 2015
 11.22 The Storm - May 4, 2016
 12.01 The Crimson King - September 28, 2016
 12.13 Spencer - February 15, 2017
 12.22 Red Light - May 10, 2017
 13.01 Wheels Up - September 27, 2017
 13.13 Cure - January 24, 2018
13.22 Believer - April 18, 2018
14.01 300 - October 3, 2018
14.10 Flesh and Blood - December 12, 2018
14.15 Truth or Dare - February 6, 2019
15.10 And in the End - February 19, 2020

As director of photography 
 Somewhere, Tomorrow (1983)
 Anna to the Infinite Power (1983)
 The Night Train to Kathmandu (1988)
 Fatal Skies (1990)
 Almost Pregnant (1992)
 Death Ring (1992)
 The Last Job (1993)
 Body of Influence (1993)
 Shootfighter: Fight to the Death (1993)
  Sins of the Night (1993)
  Working Stiffs (1994)
  Horses and Champions (1994)
  A Kiss Goodnight (1994)
 Two Guys Talkin' About Girls (1996)
 Exiled (1998)

Oz (1998) - 8 episodes 
 The Tip
 Ancient Tribes
 Great Men
 Losing Your Appeal
 Family Bizness 
 Strange Bedfellows 
 Animal Farm
 Escape from Oz

Trinity (1998 - 1999) - 9 episodes 
 Pilot (1998)
 In a Yellow Wood (1998)
 No Secrets (1998)
  In Loco Parentis (1998)
 ...To Forgive, Divine (1998)
 Hang Man Down (1998)
 Having Trouble with the Language (1999) 
 Breaking In, Breaking Out, Breaking Up, Breaking Down (1999)
 Patron Saint of Impossible Causes (1999)

New York Undercover (1996 - 1999) - 44 episodes 
 Catharsis (1999) 
 The Troubles (1998) 
 Going Native (1998) 
 Sign o' the Times (1998) 
 The Unusual Suspects (1998) 
 Capital Punishment (1998) 
 Quid Pro Quo (1998) 
 Rat Trap (1998)
 Mob Street (1998) 
 Spare Parts (1998) 
 Pipeline (1998) 
 Drop Dead Gorgeous (1998) 
 Change, Change, Change (1998) 
 The Last Hurrah (1997) 
 No Place Like Hell (1997)
 Hubris (1997) 
 Descell (1997)
 The Promised Land (1997) 
 Outrage (1997) 
 School's Out (1997)
 The Solomon Papers (1997)
 Fade Out (1997)
 Grim Reaper (1997)
 Brown Like Me (1996) 
 Going Platinum (1996)
 Without Mercy (1996) 
 Don't Blink (1996) 
 Smack Is Back (1996) 
 Kill the Noise (1996)
 Rule of Engagement (1996) 
 Blue Boy (1996) 
 Tough Love (1996)
 A Time of Faith: Part 2 (1996) 
 A Time of Faith: Part 1 (1996) 
 If This World Were Mine (1996)
 Deep Cover (1996) 
 No Greater Love (1996) 
 Andre's Choice (1996) 
 The Enforcers (1996) 
 The Reckoning (1996) 
 Unis (1996) 
 Checkmate (1996) 
 Sympathy for the Devil (1996) 
 Toy Soldiers (1996)

Third Watch (1999 - 2005) - 129 episodes

Criminal Minds (2005 - 2010) - 24 episodes 
 1.02 Compulsion - September 28, 2005
 1.03 Won't Get Fooled Again - October 5, 2005
 1.04 Plain Sight - October 12, 2005
 1.05 Broken Mirror - October 19, 2005
 1.06 L.D.S.K. - November 2, 2005
 1.07 The Fox - November 9, 2005
 1.08 Natural Born Killer - November 16, 2005
 1.09 Derailed - November 23, 2005
 1.10 The Popular Kids - November 30, 2005
 1.11 Blood Hungry - December 14, 2005
 1.12 What Fresh Hell? - January 11, 2006
 1.13 Poison - January 18, 2006
 1.14 Riding the Lightning - January 25, 2006
 1.15 Unfinished Business - March 1, 2006
 1.16 The Tribe - March 8, 2006
 1.17 A Real Rain - March 22, 2006
 1.18 Somebody's Watching - March 29, 2006
 1.19 Machismo - April 12, 2006
 1.20 Charm and Harm - April 19, 2006
 1.21 Secrets and Lies - May 3, 2006
 1.22 The Fisher King: Part 1 - May 10, 2006
 2.01 The Fisher King: Part 2  - September 20, 2006
 5.17 Solitary Man - March 10, 2010
 5.19 Rite of Passage - April 14, 2010

QuickBites (2011) - 1 episode 
 Sack Lunch (2011)

References 

Living people
Year of birth missing (living people)